was a district located in Yamagata, Japan.

As of 2003, the district had an estimated population of 9,921 and a density of 38.84 persons per km2. The total area is 255.40 km2.

The district dissolved when Atsumi become part of the new city of Tsuruoka on October 1, 2005.

Towns and villages
 Atsumi

Former districts of Yamagata Prefecture